Shake the Missile Base is a punk, experimental noise rock album and the 13th album released by New York punk/experimental bassist/flutist Steve Lieberman (The Gangsta Rabbi)age 49 at the time of release, 27 November 2007, six weeks before Lieberman was committed to a local psych ward for cutting and other complications of major depressive and bipolar disorders. His failing mental health is evidenced repetitively on the album, especially in the songs "Public Suicide", "The Flagellator" and "Ld50'.

During a tour for Shake the Missile Base in the spring of 2008, Lieberman cut himself on stage during the performance of "Public Suicide" in at New York's Crazy Donkey club.

"Public Suicide" and "Sex Whore" reached the top ten on SoundClick's rock chart in 2008.

Track listing

Personnel
Steve Lieberman – bass guitars, vocals, flutes, recorders,Laotian Concorbit flute, shahnai, renaissance flute, zaphon trombone, melodica, beatmachines

Videos

References

Steve Lieberman albums
2007 albums